The list of ship decommissionings in 2005 includes a chronological list of all ships decommissioned in 2005.



See also 

2005
 Ship decommissionings
Ship